The National Theatre in Oslo is one of Norway's largest and most prominent venues for performance of dramatic arts.

History
The theatre had its first performance on 1 September 1899 but can trace its origins to Christiania Theatre, which was founded in 1829. There were three official opening performances, on subsequent days in September: first, selected pieces by Ludvig Holberg, then An Enemy of the People by Henrik Ibsen, and on the third day Sigurd Jorsalfar by Bjørnstjerne Bjørnson.

National Theatre was founded as a private institution and weathered several financial crises until 1929, when the Norwegian government started providing modest support. A number of famous Norwegians have served as artistic directors for the theatre, but Vilhelm Krag who took over in 1911, is credited as having brought the theatre into its "golden age".

The theatre is often considered the home for Ibsen's plays, and most of his works have been performed here. Notable is also the children's Christmas play Journey to the Christmas Star, written by the  theatre's finance director Sverre Brandt (1880–1962) and performed for the first time in 1924.

The main building is centrally located between the Royal Palace, Oslo and the Parliament of Norway.  It is served by National Theatre Station and National Theatre metro stations.  It was designed by architect Henrik Bull (1864–1953).

The theatre organisation manages four stages: the main stage, the amphitheatre and Painting Parlour within the main building. The fourth is the Torshov Theatre in the Torshov district of Oslo.

Directors of the Theatre 

 1899–1907 Bjørn Bjørnson
 1908–1911 Vilhelm Krag
 1911–1923 Halfdan Christensen
 1923–1927 Bjørn Bjørnson
 1928–1930 Einar Skavlan
 1930–1933 Halfdan Christensen
 1933–1934 Anton Rønneberg (acting)
 1934–1935 Johe. Wiers-Jensen
 1935–1941 Axel Otto Normann
 1941–1945 Gustav Berg-Jæger
 1945–1946 Axel Otto Normann
 1946–1960 Knut Hergel
 1960–1961 Carl Fredrik Engelstad
 1962–1967 Erik Kristen-Johanssen
 1967–1978 Arild Brinchmann
 1978–1986 Toralv Maurstad
 1986–1988 Kjetil Bang-Hansen
 1988–1990 Ellen Horn, Ole-Jørgen Nilsen and Sverre Rødahl
 1990–1992 Stein Winge
 1992–2000 Ellen Horn
 2000–2008 Eirik Stubø
 2009–2020 Hanne Tømta
 2021–present Kristian Seltun

See also

Deutsches Theater, Oslo

References

External links
  

1899 establishments in Norway
Oslo, National Theatre
Theatres in Oslo
Theatres completed in 1899